Gāo Fènghàn (高鳳翰, 1683–1749) was born in Shandong to a minor bureaucrat. He was a painter, poet, and seal-carver, and he later became associated with the Yangzhou school of painters. These painters were known as eccentrics for their unorthodox style and preference for individualism. Gāo Fènghàn is not usually considered of the eight Yangzhou eccentrics, but is associational. Like his father, he served a minor post in the bureaucracy, but this did not occur until 1739. In 1736, this job led to his imprisonment. The following year, injuries during his time in prison combined with arthritis to disable his right hand. After that he painted with his left. These paintings have since gained some renown among Chinese art collectors.

Works

Sources
Chinese Paintings in the Ashmolean Museum Oxford(48) Oxford 
Artnet Page on him

External links
Gao Fenghan in the collection of the Metropolitan Museum, New York

1683 births
1749 deaths
Qing dynasty painters
Painters from Shandong
Artists from Qingdao